Paragon Restaurant & Bar, or simply Paragon, was a restaurant with two locations in the United States. The San Francisco restaurant closed in 2017, and the Portland, Oregon location closed in 2018. The restaurants were owned by Moana Restaurant Group.

San Francisco
The San Francisco restaurant operated from 1991 to 2017.

Portland, Oregon
The restaurant in northwest Portland's Pearl District began serving brunch in 2012. Chef Lawrence "Rocky" Smith was nominated in Eater Portland Hottest Chef competition in 2013. Bob Brunner was the restaurant's beverage director, as of 2013.

In 2014, Thrillist's Drew Tyson described the restaurant as a "casually industrial eat/drink spot". The interior featured a fireplace and the menu included a grilled cheese sandwich and tomato soup.

The Star, a pizza restaurant chain, moved into the space after Paragon closed.

References

External links

 Paragon (Portland) at Zomato

1991 establishments in California
2017 disestablishments in California
2018 disestablishments in Oregon
Defunct restaurants in Portland, Oregon
Defunct restaurants in the San Francisco Bay Area
Pearl District, Portland, Oregon
Restaurants disestablished in 2017
Restaurants disestablished in 2018
Restaurants established in 1991
Restaurants in San Francisco